Simon Bovey (born 1960), is a British scriptwriter and director.  He has written several science fiction dramas for BBC Radio, as well as episodes of the daytime drama Doctors.

Partial list of credits

Film and video
 The Waiting (2000) - writer and director.  A psychodrama set among a group of career criminals.
 The Un-gone (2007) - writer and director.  A science fiction short feature concerning teleportation.

Television
 Doctors episodes For Love (2005) and Burdens (2011).

Radio
 Slipstream - Extraterrestrial technology at the end of the Second World War.
 The Voice of God - Acoustic experiments on Australian aboriginal sacred lands disturb the earth.
 Cold Blood - A mysterious survivor of the cold arrives at an Antarctic research station.
 Hive Mind - Bees are extinct and have been replaced by honeybots, with disturbing consequences.
 The Iceman - Forensic science and a serial killer in 1880s London.
 Franklin - Cartoonist Charles Schulz receives a letter in 1968 suggesting he add a black character to his "Peanuts" cartoon strip. 
 City of Spires - A Doctor Who audio drama for Big Finish Productions.
 The Launch - Ex-Battle of Britain pilot Jack Avery is determined to avenge his brother's death.
 Sargasso - Elver season on the River Severn - a time of mystery and danger. The wrong time and place for a young man to search for his place in the world.

External links
 
 Simon Bovey website

References

British writers
British directors
Living people
1979 births